Caranzol railway station (station code: CRZ) is a small railway station in South Goa district, Goa. It serves Caranzol village. The station consists of 1 platform. The platform is not well sheltered. It lacks many facilities including water and sanitation. This station is one of three in the Braganza Ghats. This is the last station in Goa before the line passes into Karnataka.

References

Hubli railway division
Railway stations in South Goa district